Stephen Bloyce (born 11 November 1980) was an English cricketer. He was a right-handed batsman and a right-arm medium-fast bowler who played for Berkshire. He was born in Reading.

Bloyce began his career in the Minor Counties Championship for Berkshire. He played a single List A match, in the 2004 C&G Trophy, against Kent. From the tailend, he scored a duck, and took figures of 1-66 from 6 overs.

He continued to play for Berkshire until 2005. Between 2005 and 2006 he played in the Cockspur Cup for Finchampstead.

External links
Stephen Bloyce at CricketArchive 

1980 births
Living people
English cricketers
Berkshire cricketers
Sportspeople from Reading, Berkshire